Spanish Serenade (Spanish: Ronda española) is a 1952 Spanish musical film directed by Ladislao Vajda, and starring José Isbert and Manolo Morán. The film was a success on its release.

Plot 
Many women from the Women's Section of the Falange in the 50's went to America by boat to show the folklore of Spain in all their countries. The show was an entertainment for the émigrés who were on the other side of the Atlantic. The women left their homes and embarked on "Mount Albertia". On the boat trip, the relationship between all the crew members was the most fun, although many of them longed for their place of origin. Wherever they go, luck is on their side.

Cast
 Manuel Aguilera as Tipo 1º 
 Margarita Alexandre as Diana 
 Ramón Baillo as Repartidor de telégrafos 
 Barta Barri as Jefe de los saboteadores 
 Félix Briones as Capitán 2º 
 Beni Deus
 Adriano Dominguez as Andrés 
 Luciano Díaz as Chato 
 Miguel Ángel Fernandez
 Fernando Heiko Vassel as Teniente en Curaçao 
 Casimiro Hurtado as Tipo 2º 
 José Isbert as Capitán del barco 
 Carolina Jiménez as Mercedes 
 Milagros Leal as Lola 
 Julia Martínez as Rosita
 Alejandro Millán as Oficial 2º 
 Manolo Morán as Morgan 
 Joaquin Musulen as Mariano
 María Esperanza Navarro as Ana
 Clotilde Poderós as Victoria
 Elvira Quintillá as Magdalena
 Enrique Ramírez as Misionero 
 José Riesgo as Agregado
 Santiago Rivero as Tipo 3º
 José María Rodero as Juan
 Gerardo Rodríguez as Capellán 
 Alfonso Rojas as Capitán 2º
 Emilio Ruiz de Córdoba as Capitán 3º 
 Elena Salvador as Ángeles
 Juana Sebastian as Luisa
 José Suárez as Pablo
 Roberto Zara as Giulio

References

Bibliography
 Bentley, Bernard. A Companion to Spanish Cinema. Boydell & Brewer 2008.

External links 

1952 films
Spanish musical films
1952 musical films
1950s Spanish-language films
Films directed by Ladislao Vajda
Films scored by Jesús García Leoz
1950s Spanish films